Collectables is a reissue record label founded in 1980 by Jerry Greene. Jerry Greene formed Lost Nite and Crimson record labels. Soul Survivors gained the hit "Expressway to Your Heart" (1967) while on Crimson Records.

History
It maintains a catalogue of over 3,400 active titles on compact disc, with thousands of additional titles available on vinyl. It has released hundreds of recordings from the vaults of major labels, such as Columbia, Atlantic, RCA, Capitol, Vee-Jay and others, making many available on CD for the first time. Genres found on Collectables include doo-wop, rockabilly, rock'n'roll, pop, rock, funk, jazz, comedy, blues, and funk blues. Collectables released Johnny "Guitar" Watson, the Cleftones, and doo wop albums.

Collectables publishes the Priceless Collection series of budget compilations. Many of the label's other releases combine the contents of two original LPs on a single CD. The company also manufactures multi-CD compilation box sets sold exclusively through retailers such as QVC, Costco and Sam's Club.

Collectables is one of a group of companies, including Alpha Video, Gotham Distributing Corporation and the e-commerce website OLDIES.com, owned and operated by Jerry Greene and the Greene family.

Quality of sound
Early LPs and CDs were often dubbed from scratchy records. Both Sides Now publisher Mike Callahan (in his book of CD reviews Oldies on CD), regularly gave early Collectables' CDs low scores based on sound quality. Over the years, the sound quality has improved greatly on Collectables' releases. Beginning in the mid-1990s, Little Walter DeVenne remastered many of the label's reissues, and the company has also made extensive use of the in-house mastering and restoration services of the major labels from whom they license material.

Artists
The following artists have had at least one recording re-issued  on the Collectables label.

1910 Fruitgum Company
Gregory Abbott
Barbara Acklin
Roy Acuff
Faye Adams
Johnny Adams
Cannonball Adderley
The Addrisi Brothers
The Ad Libs
Jewel Akens
Al B. Sure!
Alabama(group)
The Alan Parsons Project
Lee Allen
Mose Allison
The Allman Brothers Band
America
The Ames Brothers
Ed Ames
Ernestine Anderson
Lee Andrews & The Hearts
Chuck Berry
Blues Magoos
Brass Construction
Brotherhood of Man
Dave Brubeck
Anita Bryant
B.T. Express
The Buckinghams
The Capris
The Clickettes
Ray Conniff
The Capitols
Bruce Channel
The Channels
Chubby Checker
The Checkmates
Don Cherry
Dee Clark
The Classics
The Cleftones
Ray Conniff
The Crests
The Cyrkle
The Danleers
Doris Day
Jimmy Dean
The Dell Vikings
Devo
Dion
Dion and the Belmonts
Ronnie Dove
Al Downing & The Poe Cats
The Drifters
Sheena Easton
The Edsels
Ray Ellis
Emerson, Lake & Palmer
The Emotions
Preston Epps
The Fabulaires
Percy Faith
Fancy
The Five Discs
The 5 Royales
The Five Satins
John Fred & His Playboy Band
Stan Freberg
The Harptones
The Hi-Lo's
Lena Horne
Billy Idol

The Islanders
Burl Ives
J.J. Jackson
Wanda Jackson
Harry James
The Jive Five
Johnny Maestro & the Brooklyn Bridge
The Kodaks
Buddy Knox
Andre Kostelanetz
Mark Lindsay
Little Joe Blue
Lewis Lymon & The Teenchords
The Mandrake Memorial
The Marcells
Johnny Mathis
Gene McDaniels
The Mods
Lou Monte
New York City
The Nutmegs
The Outcasts (Manhasset, NY)
The Outcasts (Texas, USA)
The Paragons(USA, doo wop)

Carl Perkins
Dan Pickett
? and the Mysterians
The Raindrops
Randy & the Rainbows
Eddie Rambeau
Genya Ravan
The Ravens
Lou Rawls
Johnnie Ray
Red Crayola
Jim Reeves
Johnny Rivers
Kenny Rogers
The Royal Guardsmen
Joey Scarbury
Marlena Shaw
The Shells
The Sheppards
Dinah Shore
Bobby Short
The Silhouettes
Ginny Simms
Joe Simon
Warren Smith
The Spaniels
Benny Spellman
Crispian St. Peters
Jo Stafford
Terry Stafford
The Staple Singers
Kay Starr
Ray Stevens
Al Stewart
Enzo Stuarti
Sugarloaf
Gene Summers
The Styles
The Sunrays
The Super Disco Band
The Swallows
Billy Swan
Bettye Swann
13th Floor Elevators
The Tokens
Kenny Vance
Jimmy Velvit
Johnny "Guitar" Watson
We The People
Roger Whittaker
The Willows
Joe Zawinul

See also
 Charly Records
 Rhino records
 Kent Records
 Bear Family Records
 Eric Records
 List of record labels

References

External links
 Official website
 

Companies based in Philadelphia
American independent record labels
Reissue record labels
Jazz record labels
Record labels established in 1981
Rock record labels
Blues record labels